The sport of sailing involves a variety of competitive sailing formats that are sanctioned through various sailing federations and yacht clubs. Racing disciplines include matches within a fleet of sailing craft, between a pair thereof or among teams. Additionally, there are specialized competitions that include setting speed records. Racing formats include both closed courses and point-to-point contests; they may be in sheltered waters, coast-wise or on the open ocean. Most competitions are held within defined classes or ratings that either entail one type of sailing craft to ensure a contest primarily of skill or rating the sailing craft to create classifications or handicaps.

On water, a sailing competition among multiple vessels is a regatta, which usually consists of multiple individual races, where the boat crew that performs best in over the series of races is the overall winner. There is a broad variety of kinds of races and sailboats used for racing from large yacht to dinghy racing. Much racing is done around buoys or similar marks in protected waters, while some longer offshore races cross open water. All kinds of boats are used for racing, including small dinghies, catamarans, boats designed primarily for cruising, and purpose-built raceboats.  The Racing Rules of Sailing govern the conduct of yacht racing, windsurfing, kitesurfing, model boat racing, dinghy racing and virtually any other form of racing around a course with more than one vessel while powered by the wind.

The Barcolana regatta of the Italian yacht club Società Velica di Barcola e Grignano is currently the Guinness World Record holder as the "largest sailing race" with 2,689 boats and over 16,000 sailors at the starting line.

Membership

International federation 

World Sailing (WS) is recognized by the International Olympic Committee as the world governing body for the sport of sailing yacht racing. It was formed in 1904 as the International Yacht Racing Union and then called the International Sailing Federation until rebranding 2014.

National federations

Yacht clubs 

Many town yacht clubs maintain their own racing teams for both juniors and adults. Often several yacht clubs will get together to hold events that can include more than 100 entered boats per race making up the regatta. Although often both adults and juniors sail the same classes of boat.

Event disciplines

Fleet racing 
Fleet races can have anywhere from four boats to hundreds of boats in a race. A regatta must have at least three races to be counted. Each boat's place in each race is added to compile a final score. The lowest scorer wins.

Match racing 

In match racing only two boats compete against each other.  The best known competition of this type is the America's Cup.  The tactics involved in match racing are different from those of other races, because the objective is merely to arrive at the finish line before the opponent, which is not necessarily as fast as possible.  The tactics involved at the start are also special.

Team racing 
Team racing is most often between two teams of three boats each. It involves similar technique to match racing but has the added dimension that it is the overall scoring of the race that matters. In three on three team racing, this means that the team that scores ten or less points wins. For this reason, many tactics are used to advance teammates to make stable combinations for winning. The stable combinations most commonly sought are "Play one", which is 1-2-anything, "Play two" or 2-3-4, and "Play 4", a 1-4-5 combination. These are generally regarded as the best setups to win and the hardest for the opposing team to play offense against.

Speed Sailing 
Is managed by World Speed Sailing Record Council

Wave riding 
Is common to board sports.

Others 
Both windsurfing and kiteboarding are experimenting with new formats.

Common race formats

Short course racing 

Harbor or buoy races are conducted in protected waters, and are quite short, usually taking anywhere from a few minutes to a few hours. All sorts of sailing craft are used for these races, including keel-boats of all sizes, as well as dinghies, trailer sailors, catamarans, skiffs, sailboards, and other small craft.

This kind of race is most commonly run over one or more laps of a triangular course marked by a number of buoys. The course starts from an imaginary line drawn from a 'committee boat' to the designated 'starting' buoy or 'pin'. A number of warning signals are given telling the crews exactly how long until the race starts. The aim of each crew is to cross the start line at full speed exactly as the race starts. A course generally involves tacking upwind to a 'windward' marker or buoy. Then bearing away onto a downwind leg to a second jibe marker. Next another jibe on a second downwind leg to the last mark which is called the 'downwind mark' (or 'leeward mark'). At this mark the boats turn into wind once again to tack to the finish line.

The most famous and longest running of these events are:
 Olympics
 America's Cup
 Cowes Week
 Mug Race

Coastal/Inshore racing
Inshore racing is yacht racing not in protected waters but along and generally within sight of land or from land to nearby islands, as distinct from offshore racing across open water and oceans. The duration of races may be daylight only, overnight or passage races of several days.  Some races, such as the Swiftsure Yacht Race, are actually a group of inshore races of various distances along overlapping courses to allow for different classes and skills. Depending on location, stability and safety equipment requirements will be more extensive than for harbor racing, but less so than for offshore racing.  Different levels of requirement for navigation, sleeping cooking and water storage also apply.

Offshore racing 

Offshore yacht races are held over long distances and in open water; such races usually last for at least a number of hours. The longest offshore races involve a circumnavigation of the world.

Some of the most famous offshore races are as follows
 Sydney to Hobart Yacht Race
 Transpacific Yacht Race
 Fastnet Race
 Bermuda Race
 Hamilton Island Race Week
 Chicago Yacht Club Race to Mackinac
 Governors Cup 
 South Atlantic Race

Oceanic racing 
Several fully crewed round-the-world races are held, including:
 The Ocean Race (formerly known as the Whitbread Round the World Race and the Volvo Ocean Race)
 Global Challenge
 Clipper Round the World Race

South African yacht clubs organise the South Atlantic Race (the former Cape to Rio race), the Governor's Cup from Cape Town to St. Helena Island, and a race between Durban and Mauritius.
    
Single-handed ocean yacht racing began with the race across the Atlantic Ocean by William Albert Andrews and Josiah W. Lawlor in 1891; however, the first regular single-handed ocean race was the Single-Handed Trans-Atlantic Race, first held in 1960. The first round-the-world yacht race was the Sunday Times Golden Globe Race of 1968–1969, which was also a single-handed race with the only winner, Robin Knox-Johnston on Suhaili; this inspired the present-day Velux 5 Oceans Race (formerly the BOC Challenge / Around Alone) and the Vendée Globe. Single-handed racing has seen a great boom in popularity in recent years.

There is some controversy about the legality of sailing single-handed over long distances, as the navigation rules require "that every vessel shall at all times maintain a proper lookout..."; single-handed sailors can only keep a sporadic lookout, due to the need to sleep, tend to navigation, etc.

Other races 
Certain races do not fit in the above categories. One such is the Three peaks yacht race in the UK which is a team competition involving sailing, cycling and running.

Classes and ratings 

Many design factors have a large impact on the speed at which a boat can complete a course, including the size of a boat's sails, its length, and the weight and shape of its hull. Because of these differences, it can be difficult to compare the skills of the sailors in a race if they are sailing very different boats. For most forms of yacht racing, one of two solutions to this problem are used: either all boats are required to race on a first to finish basis (these groups of boats are called classes), or a handicapping system is used which implements correction factors.

Manufacturer controlled classes 
Each class has a detailed set of specifications that must be met for the boat to be considered a member of that class. Some classes (e.g.the Laser) have very tight specifications ensuring that there is virtually no difference between the boats (except for age) - these classes are sometimes called strict one-design.

In one-design racing all boats must conform to the same standard, the class rules, thus emphasizing the skill of the skipper and crew rather than having the results depend on equipment superiority.
 
These kind of classes are most commonly brand linked to brands with Laser Performance, RS Sailing, Melges and J/Boats range being good examples.

Measurement controlled classes 

Popular International Classes include the Optimist, 470, Snipe and Etchells.

Measurement classes box rule 
A box rule specifies a maximum overall size for boats in the class, as well as features such as stability. Competitors in these classes are then free to enter their own boat designs, as long as they do not exceed the box rule. No handicap is then applied.

 International One Metre
 Class 40
 TP 52
 Open 60

Measurement development classes 

 Moth
 International 14

Measurement formula-based classes 

A construction class is based on a formula or set of restrictions which the boat's measurements must fit to be accepted to the class. Resulting boats are all unique, yet (ideally) relatively close in size and performance. Perhaps the most popular and enduring construction formula is The Metre Rule, around which several still popular classes were designed. With the 12 metre being the most famous due to its involvement in the America's Cup.

Handicap racing 
When all the yachts in a race are not members of the same class, then a handicap is used to adjust the times of boats. The handicap attempts to specify a "normal" speed for each boat, usually based either on measurements taken of the boat, or on the past record of that kind of boat. Each boat is timed over the specified course. After it has finished, the handicap is used to adjust each boat's finishing time. The results are based on this sum.

Popular handicapping systems include 
 ORCi
 ORC Club
 IRC (Sailing)
 PHRF
 Portsmouth Yardstick

Earlier popular rating systems include IOR and IMS.

Gender criteria 

The majority of sailing events are "open" events in which males and females compete together on equal terms either as individuals or part of team. Sailing has had female only World Championships since the 1970s to encourage participation and now hosts more than 30 such World Championship titles each year. For the 2016 Olympics, compulsory mixed gender in the event were added for the first time.

Additional criteria 

In addition the following criteria are sometimes applied to events:
 Age
 Nationality
 Disabled Classification
 Sailor Classification

See also 

 Dinghy racing
 Former Olympic sailing classes
 Olympic sailing classes
 Retired after finishing

References

External links
 International Paralympic Committee page on sailing

 
Summer Olympic sports